Ivy George is an American child actress. Her first acting role was opposite Robin Williams on his last television series before his death. She has two younger siblings, Finnegan and Elsa, who are also actors. She enjoys karate, swimming, creating art, and playing guitar.

Career
George's first professional acting job came at 6 years old in a scene opposite Robin Williams. She then went on to guest star in other TV Series including Kirby Buckets, and Agent Carter. She then appeared in Girl Meets World and Big Little Lies. Ivy has also appeared in quite a few films including Paranormal Activity: The Ghost Dimension, and Brimstone

In 2016, Ivy George was nominated at the 37th Young Artist Awards for the film Paranormal Activity: The Ghost Dimension

Filmography

Film

Television

References

External links

Living people
21st-century American actresses
American child actresses
American film actresses
Actresses from Los Angeles
American television actresses
Year of birth missing (living people)